Orange Board of Education is a comprehensive community public school district that is headquartered in the city of Orange, in Essex County, New Jersey, United States, and serves students in pre-kindergarten through twelfth grade. The district is one of 31 former Abbott districts statewide that were established pursuant to the decision by the New Jersey Supreme Court in Abbott v. Burke which are now referred to as "SDA Districts" based on the requirement for the state to cover all costs for school building and renovation projects in these districts under the supervision of the New Jersey Schools Development Authority. The district was considered high performing as per the New Jersey Department of Education having achieved 80% and above on all indicators within the NJQSAC evaluation in June 2020.

As of the 2020–21 school year, the district, comprised of 12 schools, had an enrollment of 5,629 students and 507.5 classroom teachers (on an FTE basis), for a student–teacher ratio of 11.1:1.

The district is classified by the New Jersey Department of Education as being in District Factor Group "A", the lowest of eight groupings. District Factor Groups organize districts statewide to allow comparison by common socioeconomic characteristics of the local districts. From lowest socioeconomic status to highest, the categories are A, B, CD, DE, FG, GH, I and J.

History
In 1948 the district had a racially integrated school system with an open enrollment school system in which families could choose which schools their children could attend. In 1948 one predominately African-American school had five teachers deemed "colored".

Schools
Schools in the district (with 2020–21) enrollment data from the National Center for Education Statistics) are:
Preschool
Orange Early Childhood Center (188; in PreK)
John Robert Lewis Early Childhood Center (NA; Pre-K)
Dr. Cayce Cummins, Principal
Elementary Schools
Central Elementary School (319; K-2)
Denise White, Principal
Cleveland Street School (303; K-7)
Robert Pettit, Principal
Forest Street Community School (410; PreK-7)
Dr. Yancisca Loften-Cooke, Principal
Heywood Avenue School (355; PreK-7)
Dion Patterson, Principal
Lincoln Avenue School (708; K-7)
Frank Iannucci, Principal
Oakwood Avenue Community School (425; PreK-7)
Dana Gaines, Principal
Park Avenue School (569; K-7)
Dr.Myron Hackett, Principal
Rosa Parks Central Community School (999; Grades 3–7) formerly Main Street School and Central School)
Dr. Debra Joseph-Charles, Principal
Scholars Academy (NA)
Karen Machuca, Principal
Middle School (Secondary)
Orange Preparatory Academy (679; 8–9, formerly Orange Middle School)
Carrie Halstead, Principal
High Schools (Secondary)
Orange High School (840; 10–12)
Jason Belton, Principal
STEM Innovation Academy of the Oranges (160; 9–12)
Dr. Devonii Reid, Principal

Administration
Core members of the district's administration are:
Dr. Gerald Fitzhugh II, Superintendent
Jason E. Ballard, Board Secretary / School Business Administrator

Board of education
The district's board of education, comprised of nine members, sets policy and oversees the fiscal and educational operation of the district through its administration. Since November 2017, it is a Type II school district, in which the board's trustees are elected directly by voters to serve three-year terms of office on a staggered basis, with three seats up for election each year held (since 2018) as part of the November general election. The board appoints a superintendent to oversee the district's day-to-day operations and a business administrator to supervise the business functions of the district. In November 2016, voters approved the change from a Type I district, in which the board is appointed by the mayor, to a Type II district, in which residents vote for board members. In November 2017, the first election for the elected board took place.

References

External links 
Orange Board of Education
 
School Data for the Orange Board of Education, National Center for Education Statistics

Orange, New Jersey
District boards of education in the United States
New Jersey Abbott Districts
New Jersey District Factor Group A
School districts in Essex County, New Jersey